Yana Berlin is an American entrepreneur and writer best known as the founder of Fabulously40.com.

Background
At the age of 12, Berlin came to the United States from Russia and by age 21 had started her own business.

In 2006, Berlin founded the social network Fabulously40.com. The site is geared to women 40 years old and beyond and has thousands of members worldwide. She has published many editorials on Fabulously40.com and other sites addressing women's issues and offering solutions, strategies and tips.

In 2009, she was named the winner of StartupNation's first ever Leading Moms in Business competition. Also that year, Berlin and her daughters produced a Web TV show, The Love or Hate Debate.

In 2011, after being diagnosed with breast cancer, Berlin wrote a parenting memoir because her kids asked her and with the hope of reminding parents that they have to be parents first and friends much later in life. Life is a Blender, reads like a novel, with frank views regarding the topics of marriage, divorce, single-parenting, remarriage, blending a family, rules and discipline, the role of grandparents and siblings, chores, responsibilities and schooling.

Books

References

External links
  Fabulously40.com Official site

Living people
Businesspeople from San Diego
Russian emigrants to the United States
Year of birth missing (living people)
Place of birth missing (living people)
Russian businesspeople in the United States